Zinc finger FYVE domain-containing protein 9 or SARA (SMAD anchor for receptor activation) is a protein that in humans is encoded by the ZFYVE9 gene. SARA contains a double zinc finger (FYVE domain).

SARA is an anchoring protein involved in TGF beta signaling. It binds to the MH2 domain of the R-SMADs SMAD2 and SMAD3 as well as the type I TGF beta receptors. It facilitates the phosphorylation of the R-SMAD, which subsequently dissociates from SARA and the receptor and binds a coSMAD where they enter the nucleus as transcription factors.

References

External links 
 PDBe-KB provides an overview of all the structure information available in the PDB for Human Zinc finger FYVE domain-containing protein 9

Developmental genes and proteins
FYVE domain